Ohio Western Reserve National Cemetery is a United States National Cemetery located in the city of Seville, in Medina County, Ohio. Administered by the United States Department of Veterans Affairs, it encompasses , and as of 2021 had over 45,000 interments.

History 

Dedicated in 2000, Ohio Western Reserve National Cemetery  is the second national cemetery built in Ohio and the 119th National Cemetery created. Only a portion of it has been developed for use, but the rest is intended to service the interment needs of veterans and their families well into the future.  The name Ohio Western Reserve refers part of the Northwest Territory, formerly known as the Connecticut Western Reserve, a tract of land in northeastern Ohio reserved by the state of Connecticut when it ceded its claims to western lands to the federal government in 1786.

Notable burials
 Edmund Abel (1921–2014) – Inventor who designed Mr. Coffee
 Ortha O. Barr Jr. (1922–2003) – Attorney, World War II veteran and prisoner of war
  Paul Drayton (1939–2000) – United States team Olympic sprinter
 Noah Purifoy (1917–2004) – Artist and World War II Navy veteran

References

External links 
 Ohio Western Reserve National Cemetery
 
 
 

Cemeteries in Medina County, Ohio
Protected areas of Medina County, Ohio
United States national cemeteries
2000 establishments in Ohio